The 140th Rifle Division was a Red Army rifle division that saw service during the Great Patriotic War. Originally formed during the prewar buildup of the Red Army, the 140th might be regarded as the unluckiest division in the Army, as it, uniquely, had to be completely, or almost completely, re-formed three times between 1941 and 1943, being destroyed in the Uman pocket during Operation Barbarossa, the Vyasma pocket during Operation Typhoon, and on the Caucasian steppes in the face of the German summer offensive of 1942. In spite of this, the fourth formation of the 140th went on to have a very distinguished record in combat, a testament to the resiliency of the Red Army in World War II.

1st Formation 
The division was first organized on August 16, 1939, at Uman in the Ukrainian (later: Kiev Special) Military District. Col. Luka Gerasimovich Basanets was appointed to command the division on the same day, and he would lead it through its entire 1st formation. On June 22, 1941, it was still in that District, and had the following order of battle:
 445th Rifle Regiment
 637th Rifle Regiment
 798th Rifle Regiment
 309th Light Artillery Regiment
 371st Howitzer Regiment
 181st Reconnaissance Battalion
When the German invasion began, the 140th was assigned to the 36th Rifle Corps in Kiev Military District (Southwestern Front) reserves, and by June 27 it was in 6th Army, facing elements of the German XXXIV Army Corps north of Khmilnyk. On June 29 the Front commander, Col. Gen. M. P. Kirponos, criticized the performance of 36th Corps, stating in part: By late July the division was in 49th Rifle Corps, still in 6th Army, near Monastyryshche, but was later relocated to Southern Front. In early August the division was trapped in the encirclement at Uman, and was destroyed by the middle of the month. The division number was finally deleted from the Soviet order of battle on September 19.

2nd Formation 
On July 2 the 13th Moscow Militia Division began forming in the Rostokino District of Moscow. Its order of battle was as follows:
 37th Militia Regiment
 38th Militia Regiment
 39th Militia Regiment
 Artillery Battalion (76mm)
 Artillery Battalion (45mm)
 Sapper, Reconnaissance and Signal Companies
By July 6 the division had 11,000 personnel assigned, including 1,000 members of the Communist Party and 700 Komsomols. Three days later the division had 13,000 personnel, but some were reassigned to other militia divisions to complete their establishments, so when the division left Moscow on July 15 it had 8,010 in the ranks, but little or no heavy equipment, motorized transport, or radios.

The division was assigned to 32nd Army at Mozhaisk by July 19 and remained in the Reserve of the Supreme High Command in that Army until it was re-designated on September 26 as the new 140th Rifle Division with:
 1305th Rifle Regiment – from 37th Militia Regiment
 1307th Rifle Regiment – from 38th Militia Regiment
 1309th Rifle Regiment – from 39th Militia Regiment
 977th Artillery Regiment – from Militia Artillery Battalion (76mm guns)
On the same day Col. Pavel Yefremovich Morozov was appointed to command, where he would continue through the 2nd formation. Since 32nd Army was in the second echelon of the forces defending Moscow it was not in the immediate front lines, but was nevertheless pocketed during Operation Typhoon just west of Vyasma by October 7. In the end the 140th was one of five divisions based on Moscow militia divisions that were encircled and destroyed in this offensive, although it was not officially disbanded until December 27. Owing to the division's position at the eastern extension of the pocket, enough personnel escaped from the encirclement to make a cadre for the next formation of the division.

3rd Formation 
The third formation of the 140th Rifle Division began in late December, based on escaped elements of the previous formation. The order of battle reverted to that of the first formation, except the howitzer regiment was no longer present, and the 309th was now a standard artillery regiment. Maj. Gen. Ivan Andreevich Kopyak was appointed divisional commander on January 29, 1942, and the unit remained in the Moscow Military District until May.

In late May the 140th was transferred to the 24th Army in the Reserve of the Supreme High Command and sent south. 24th Army arrived in Southern Front just at the opening of the German summer offensive, Operation Blue, in June. In early July the division was transferred to the reserves of 9th Army. Retreating across the open steppes with the First Panzer Army in pursuit, the 140th was caught up in the encirclement south of Millerovo and effectively destroyed by the third week of July. It is listed as "reorganizing" in the Caucasus Region on August 1, and as of August 7 General Kopyak was listed as "missing in action, presumed killed in action". The attempt to reform was abandoned and the division was officially disbanded on August 19.

4th Formation 
The fourth formation of the division began on November 1, 1942, using personnel from the NKVD, at Novosibirsk in the Siberian Military District. Its first commander, Maj. Gen. Mikhail Yenshin, was appointed the same day. It consisted of:
 96th "Chita" Rifle Regiment
 258th "Khabarovsk" Rifle Regiment
 283rd "Krasnofouminsk" Rifle Regiment
 371st "Sibirsk" Artillery Regiment
 92nd Antitank Battalion
 87th Sapper Battalion, and other supporting units.
The NKVD began forming the division, and three others, to serve as NKVD rifle divisions prior to being authorized by the Commissar of Defense on December 7. The division was passed to Red Army control as the 140th in February 1943. At that time it had 8,685 officers and men assigned, 69 percent of whom were under 30 years of age, quite a youthful cadre for a late-war division. They were also noted as being 50 percent Russian nationality, 15 percent Ukrainian, and the remaining 35 percent mixed non-Slavic. Officially these men were drawn from internal troops and border guards of the NKVD. As the Siberian Military District had no external borders, it's likely that some were taken from guards of the GULAG and other sources that were off-limits to the Red Army. On March 19, General Yenshin handed the command over to Col. Zinovii Samoilovich Shekhtman, who would, in turn, hand command to Maj. Gen. Aleksandr Yakovlevich Kiselyov on May 11.

As with the other NKVD divisions, the 140th was assigned to the 70th Army in the Central Front. During the Battle of Kursk the 70th Army fought on the left flank of the 2nd Tank Army and played a role in stopping the German 9th Army that was trying to break through to Kursk from the north. On July 7, the third day of the battle, elements of the division were holding the village of Samodurovka. From there they were conducting long-range anti-tank fire against the flank of a battlegroup from 2nd Panzer Division advancing on the key objective of Olkhovatka. The battlegroup commander, Col. Arnold Burmeister, diverted some of his armor, including Tigers, towards this threat, and drove the Soviet forces from the village, destroying a supporting company of T-34s in the process. Lacking infantry, Burmeister chose to leave Samodurovka vacant, and it was reoccupied by Soviet troops overnight. The next day, the fresh 4th Panzer Division was committed, retaking Samodurovka before beginning to advance on Teploye, which was held in strength by the 140th, backed by the 3rd Anti-Tank Brigade and the 79th Tank Brigade from the 19th Tank Corps. One battalion of the division was overrun and the German forces occupied part of the town before running into a "wall of fire" from dug-in tanks and anti-tank guns. The stand of the 140th at Teploye, along with that of the 307th Rifle Division at Ponyri, proved to be the high-water marks of 9th Army's advance.

During the subsequent Red Army counteroffensive, the 70th Army took part in Operation Kutuzov and attacked Trosna to the south of the town of Kromy. On August 5, its units reached the region southwest of Kromy, and on the 17th they reached the German "Hagen" defense line near Domakha.

Advance 
 Later that month the division was moved to the 19th Rifle Corps of the 65th Army, and participated in the advance towards the Dnepr River over the following weeks. On September 16 it assisted in liberating the town of Novgorod-Severski and was given the name of that town as its divisional honorific: This was in addition to the title Siberian, which it had carried since its fourth formation.

Battles for Belarus
By October 1, 19th Corps had reached the Sozh River, on the right flank of 65th Army south of the Iput River, and one division of the Corps, the 354th, had already taken a small bridgehead over the Sozh. Lt. Gen. Pavel Batov, commander of 65th Army, planned an advance from this bridgehead by 19th Corps in the direction of Gomel, once it was reinforced by the 140th and the 37th Guards Rifle Divisions. The attack by the three divisions began on October 1, fanning out to capture the villages of Noyve and Starye Diatlovichi from the German 6th Infantry Division. By late on the next day the bridgehead had been expanded to a depth of 4 km in heavy fighting, but Batov's commitment of 19th Corps' final division, the 162nd, was not sufficient to counter the reserves brought in by German 2nd Army, and the advance stalled before the key town of Zherebnaia, guarding the southwestern approach to Gomel. This ended the first attempt on that city.

From October 27 to November 9, Belorussian (the renamed Central) Front carried out a major regrouping as 65th Army was redeployed southwards to a large bridgehead over the Sozh south of the junction of the Dnepr and the Sozh at Loev. When the Gomel-Rechitsa Offensive began on November 10, 19th Corps was in the center of its Army, with the 140th in second echelon. The Corps' mission was to penetrate the enemy defenses between Gancharov Podel and Budishche 5 km deep, allowing the Army's mobile groups to exploit a breakthrough. Within three days the attacking Soviet forces had torn a 15 km wide and 8 – 12 km deep gap in the German defenses. 19th and 27th Rifle Corps created the penetration that allowed 1st Guards Tank and 7th Guards Cavalry Corps to break into the enemy rear. By November 15, all German communications between Kalinkovichi and Rechitsa were cut, rendering their positions in the latter city untenable. After briefly contesting the western outskirts of Rechitsa, 19th Corps was ordered to bypass and continue marching north towards Parichi, some 80 km on. Early on November 20 the 37th Guards, flanked by the 140th and 162nd, reached the Berezina River near Gorval, and the guardsmen took a small bridgehead on the east bank; on the same day Rechitsa fell to units of 48th Army.

The 65th Army continued its advance on November 22, while fresh attacks by other elements of Belorussian Front turned the German position at Gomel into a "great, sagging, tactically useless bulge", and Hitler finally authorized its evacuation on the 24th. In this same period the 140th was transferred to 18th Rifle Corps, still in 65th Army. Batov's intention now was to advance westward towards Kalinkovichi, but the arrival of 5th Panzer Division stabilized the German front, and the offensive was halted within days. By the end of the month the 140th was depleted to the point that it went into Belorussian Front reserves for rebuilding.

Battles for Ukraine and Czechoslovakia
The STAVKA sent orders to General Rokossovsky on December 9 to transfer six rifle divisions, including the 140th, to 1st Ukrainian Front. On December 13 the division was assigned to the 13th Army in that Front. By the turn of the year it was back in the front line, and on January 3, 1944, liberated the town of Novograd-Volynskiy, for which it received its first Order of the Red Banner. In February the division was transferred to the 28th Rifle Corps of the 60th Army of the same Front. It was awarded its second Order of the Red Banner on March 19 for its role in the liberation of Starokostiantyniv and several other towns in the area. In July the 140th was reassigned to the 38th Army, and remained in this Army for the duration of the war. On August 10 the division was awarded the Order of Lenin for "exemplary fulfillment of command tasks" and its "valor and courage" in the liberation of Lvov, an unusual distinction for a regular rifle division.

The 38th Army moved to the 4th Ukrainian Front in November, and the 140th remained in this Front for the duration, although it was bounced from one rifle corps to another during this time. Along with its Army, the division fought through the Carpathian Mountains and eastern Czechoslovakia during the winter and spring of 1945. During this operation the division commander, General Kiselyov, was killed in a German airstrike on January 24 while successfully directing the penetration of the strong German lines south of the Polish city of Iaslo. He was awarded the Gold Star of the Hero of the Soviet Union, posthumously, on May 23, 1945. Col. Ivan Fyodorovich Koslov held command for a week until Col. Mikhail Markovich Vlasov took command of the division on January 31; he had been named as a Hero of the Soviet Union in October 1943, while leading the 106th Rifle Division across the Dnepr, and would hold this command for the duration. At the end of the war, the 140th was near Prague, in the 101st Rifle Corps. The division ended the war with the full title of 140th Rifle, Siberian, Novgorod-Severski, Order of Lenin, twice Order of the Red Banner, Order of Suvorov, Order of Kutuzov Division. [Russian: Сибирская Новгород-Северская ордена Ленина, дважды Краснознамённая, орденов Суворова и Кутузова.]

Postwar
The 38th Army was moved back into the short-lived Lvov Military District by 1946, and the 101st Rifle Corps headquarters was established at Kolomyia. 140th Rifle Division is listed by Feskov et al. 2013, soon after the war, with the Military Unit No. (V/Ch) 28278 with headquarters seemingly located at Kalush. The division and its parent corps were both disbanded in 1946.

References

Citations

Bibliography
 
  pp. 169–70

External links
Luka Gerasimovich Basanets
Ivan Andreevich Kopyak
Mikhail Aleksandrovich Enshin
Mikhail Aleksandrovich Enshin, Hero of the Soviet Union
Aleksandr Yakovlevich Kiselyov
Mikhail Markovich Vlasov, Hero of the Soviet Union

Infantry divisions of the Soviet Union in World War II
Military units and formations established in 1939
Military units and formations disestablished in 1946
Military units and formations awarded the Order of the Red Banner